Furkan Zorba (born 25 February 1998) is a footballer who plays as a centre-back. Born in Germany, he represented Turkey at under-19 international level.

References

External links
 

1998 births
German people of Turkish descent
People from Rüsselsheim
Sportspeople from Darmstadt (region)
Footballers from Hesse
Living people
Turkish footballers
Turkey youth international footballers
German footballers
Association football defenders
Eintracht Frankfurt players
VfL Osnabrück players
Türkgücü München players
Tuzlaspor players
Diyarbakırspor footballers
3. Liga players
Regionalliga players
TFF Second League players